Slatina Air Base, located at Pristina International Airport Adem Jashari, contained the second largest military underground hangar complex in the former Yugoslavia. After the NATO bombing of Yugoslavia, the airfield was used by KFOR.

Before the Yugoslav military withdrawal, Slatina was home to the 83rd Fighter Aviation Regiment and its 123rd and 124th squadrons. These squadrons were equipped with MiG-21 Bis and MiG-21 UM aircraft.

Historical value of the air base 
During the NATO's operation against Yugoslavia 83rd fighter squadron of Yugoslavian Air Forces was based in Slatina. It did not perform any sorties and suffered no losses from NATO aircraft during the 1999 bombings. Every single aircraft remained intact.

The Slatina air base was a strategically important base which NATO had planned to use for airlifting of much of their military units in support of the UNSF Resolution 1244. Control over the airport was to be established on 12 June 1999 though on that first night the air base was seized by a battalion of Russian paratroopers.

The air base is featured in the 2019 action film The Balkan Line.

See also 

 KFOR

References

Airports in Kosovo
Yugoslav Air Force bases
Military installations of Yugoslavia
Aircraft underground hangars in Europe
Subterranean buildings and structures